Ananta Mandal (born 5 February 1983) is an Indian artist. He has been recognized with international and national honours for his watercolour, oil, and acrylic paintings. He lives and works in Mumbai, India.

Early life and education

Ananta Mandal spent his childhood in Chakdaha, West Bengal, in India. He graduated from Government College of Art & Craft, Kolkata, Calcutta University (Kolkata) in 2007 with a degree in Bachelor of Visual Arts. Mandal stayed in Kolkata from 2002 to 2007, during this period he started painting on Kolkata's life. In 2008 he moved to Mumbai.

Career
Ananta Mandal has 16 solo exhibitions in his career, starting in 2004 when he had his first solo show at Academy of Fine Arts, Kolkata as a student. He has exhibited in numerous group shows and solo exhibitions in India and abroad and he has often been invited as guest artist.

Most of Mandal's paintings are watercolor, acrylic and oil color based. His paintings depict realistic urban landscapes, city life, Bengalis durga festival (durga puja), old railway steam engine, tropical desert of Rajasthan and moods of nature. Many of his works depict the atmosphere of Mumbai and Kolkata.

Awards

Mandal has won more than 40 awards internationally and in India.

Juried art shows
2017: H. Q. Johnson Award at the Annual International Exhibition of the Northwest Watercolor Society, Washington, USA.
2013: First place at the 36th annual International Exhibition of the Watercolor Art Society-Houston, USA.
2012 : The Winsor & Newton Excellence Award – Northwest Watercolor Society, United States
2011 : Award – The Pennsylvania Watercolor Society, United States
2010 : Best of show Award – Western Federation of Watercolor Society, Utah, United States
2009 : 4th place - San Diego Watercolor Society, USA
2009 : Award - North East Watercolor Society, New York, USA
2007 : Award of Excellence, Western Federation of Watercolor Society, United States
2007 : Award, Texas Watercolor Society, Texas, United States
2006 : Award of Excellence, San Diego Watercolor Society, California, United States

Awards in India
2013: AIFACS Award - 14th all India Watercolor Exhibition, New Delhi
2012 : AIFACS Award – 100 Years of the city of New Delhi 2011. New Delhi
2011: Award for Best Landscape in Watercolor Bombay Art Society. Mumbai
2010 : Best Painting Award - R.A.D Annual Exhibition, Arannya 2010, Kolkata
2009 : Best Entry Award - The Art Society of India. Mumbai
2009 : Award – Bombay Art Society. Mumbai
2006 : Camlin Award – 7th Eastern Region, (Kokuyo Camlin), Kolkata
2006 : Award - The Art Society of India. Mumbai
2006 : Award - Lokmanya Tilak Art Exhibition, Pune
2005 : Best Water Color Painting Award - Calcutta Information Centre, Government of West Bengal, Kolkata 
2005 : Award – South-Central Zone Cultural Centre, Nagpur, Ministry of Culture (India).
2005 : Award - Indian Society of Oriental Art, Kolkata
2005 : Birla Academy Award - Birla Academy Art & Culture. Kolkata
2005 : Award - Bombay Art Society. Mumbai
2005 : Best Painting Award - Academy of Fine Arts, Kolkata
2004 : Award - Government College of Art & Craft, Kolkata
2004 : Camlin Award - Kokuyo Camlin 5th Eastern Region, Kolkata
2004 : Best Water Color Painting Award - East Zone Cultural Centre, Kolkata, Ministry of Culture (India).
2002 : Award - Government College of Art & Craft, Kolkata

References

Further reading
The Times of India, Capturing landscapes on his canvas
 
Ananta Mandal Interview
Houston Chronicle- Arts & Theater
The Times of India, Multifarious impressions of Ananta Mandal
 
Millennium Post, Treat for the senses
The pioneer, life in a metro

External links

 Official website
 Ananta Mandal at the Saatchi Gallery Saatchi Art
 Ananta Mandal on Fine Art America 
 Ananta Mandal on RtistiQ
 Ananta Mandal Profile and works FASO
 Mandel in The Times of India The Times of India

Indian Impressionist painters
Indian watercolourists
Indian portrait painters
Realist painters
1983 births
Living people
Government College of Art & Craft alumni
University of Calcutta alumni
Artists from Kolkata
People from Nadia district
Bengali male artists
Indian male painters
Painters from West Bengal
20th-century Indian painters
Indian painters
20th-century Indian male artists